"Everybody Dance" ("Everybody Dance (The Horn Song)" in international releases) is a 1998 house song recorded by American singer Barbara Tucker, who co-wrote the track with LaVette Gordon, and produced by DJ Pierre, which was based on an instrumental he recorded under the alias "The Don" as "The Horn Song." The horn solo on the single was performed by Darrell Dixon. After its release, the label rerecorded the single with Tucker adding lyrics and vocals to the song.

This was Tucker's fourth of seven number-one singles she placed on the Billboard Dance Club Songs, reaching the top spot on September 12, 1998.

Outside the United States, the single was retitled as "Everybody Dance (The Horn Song)," with several territories adding "The Don" to the credits. In the United Kingdom, this version peaked at 28 in 1998.

Track listing
CD Maxi ("Everybody Dance", US)
 Everybody Dance (Radio Edit)  3:49  
 Everybody Dance (The Don's Club Mix) 12:18  
 Everybody Dance (Feel Your Horn Dub) 7:08  
 Everybody Dance (Club Asylum Remix) 6:51  
 Everybody Dance (M.A.S. Club Vocal) 7:59  
 Bonus Track  
 The Horn Song (Original Mix)  8:41

CD Maxi ("Everybody Dance (The Horn Song)", UK)
 Everybody Dance (The Horn Song) (Radio Edit) 3:48  
 The Horn Song (The Don's Original Mix) 8:40  
 Beautiful People (Dem 2 Remix) 6:37

CD Maxi ("Everybody Dance (The Horn Song)", Australia)
 Everybody Dance (Radio Edit)  3:49  
 Everybody Dance (The Don's Club Mix)  12:18  
 Everybody Dance (Feel Your Horn Dub)  7:08  
 Everybody Dance (Club Asylum Remix) 6:51  
 Everybody Dance (M.A.S. Club Vocal) 7:59  
 The Horn Song (Original Mix)  8:41

CD Maxi ("The Horn Song", US)
A1 The Horn Song (Original Mix)  8:00  
A2 The Horn Song (Deep Bomb Mix)  8:00  
B1 The Horn Song (Wild Pitch Instrumental)  8:00  
B2 The Horn Song (Ride My Horn Mix)  8:00

References

External links
"Everyday Dance" from YouTube
"The Horn Song" from YouTube

1998 songs
1998 singles
Barbara Tucker songs
Electronic songs
House music songs